Val Verde may refer to:

Val Verde, California, a community in Los Angeles County
Val Verde (Montecito, California), estate in Santa Barbara County, listed on National Register of Historic Places
Val Verde, Texas
Val Verde Park, Texas
Val Verde County, Texas
Val Verde, New Mexico 
Battle of Valverde or Val Verde, an American Civil War battle in New Mexico Territory
Val Verde (fictional country), Spanish-speaking country resembling Panama that appeared in a number of films and television programs. Also in Hank Green's novel “A Beautifully Foolish Endeavor”
Val Verde Unified School District in Moreno Valley, California and Perris, California
Val Verde High School in Perris, California, USA

See also 
 Valverde (disambiguation)
 Verde (disambiguation)
 Val (disambiguation)